Adolpho Washington (born 7 September 1967 in Lexington, Kentucky) is a retired professional boxer. He held the IBF cruiserweight title from 1996 until 1997, and challenged twice for WBA world titles at cruiserweight and light heavyweight.

Career
Washington turned pro in 1989 at light-heavy and in 1990 lost a decision to a fighter named
K.Casimier with a 2-6-1 record. Later he beat hard-punching fringe contender Drake Thadzi on points.
1993 came his first crack at a title, taking on WBA Light Heavyweight Title holder Virgil Hill.  Washington was caught in a bizarre incident in which he was unable to continue after being cut by bumping his head against a TV camera in the 11th round. Washington was clearly losing the fight, and lost a technical decision.

Cruiserweight
The following year and one weight class higher, he beat an out-of ashape Iran Barkley on cuts and took on WBC Cruiserweight Title holder Anaclet Wamba, but failed to gain the title in a draw.  One year later, he scored a rare KO over hard-punching contender Izegwire and took on Orlin Norris for the WBA Cruiserweight Title and again came up short by a razor-thin decision.  In 1996 he was able to win a title, upsetting undefeated former Olympic Gold medalist Torsten May for the vacant IBF Cruiserweight Title.  He equally surprisingly lost the title to puncher Uriah Grant in his next bout, and never fought for a major title again.

He never looked good after that losing to Norris and May in rematches.
In 1999 he took on James Toney, the only man to stop him inside the distance, after Washington was bleeding excessively from his nose. In 2001 he lost to Vassily Jirov and retired.

Professional boxing record

See also
List of world cruiserweight boxing champions

References

External links

 

|-

|-

1967 births
Living people
American male boxers
African-American boxers
21st-century African-American people
20th-century African-American sportspeople
Boxers from Kentucky
Sportspeople from Lexington, Kentucky
Light-heavyweight boxers
World cruiserweight boxing champions
International Boxing Federation champions
International Boxing Organization champions